The Best of Crystal Gayle is the sixth compilation album by the American country music artist of the same name. It was released in August 1987 on Warner Bros. Records. The album contained Gayle's major hit singles while recording for the latter label between 1982 and 1986. She would depart from Warner Bros. the following year.

Background and reception 
The Best of Crystal Gayle consists of ten tracks, all of which had been previously recorded and been issued on Gayle's albums for the Warner Bros. label. According to Allmusic, the album contained many of her major hits with the record company including, "'Til I Gain Control Again", "Turning Away", and "Straight to the Heart". The album was originally released in several different formats. It was first issued as a Vinyl LP, followed by an audio cassette and then a compact disc. The Best of Crystal Gayle was released in the United States, Canada, Germany, and Japan.

The Best of Crystal Gayle was officially issued in August 1987 on Warner Bros. Records. The record reached the fifty third position on the Billboard Top Country Albums on the chart issued for August 13. The album spawned one single in late 1987 entitled "Only Love Can Save Me Now". It originally had been recorded for Gayle's 1986 studio album Straight to the Heart. The single peaked at number eleven on the Billboard Hot Country Singles & Tracks chart and number eighteen on the Canadian RPM Country Tracks chart.

Track listing

Charts
Weekly charts

References 

1987 compilation albums
Crystal Gayle albums
Warner Records compilation albums